The 1989 Asian Athletics Championships was the eighth edition of the international outdoor athletics competition between Asian nations, organised by the Asian Athletics Association. The six-day competition was held from 14–19 November at the Jawaharlal Nehru Stadium in New Delhi, India. It featured 40 events, 22 for men and 18 for women, with the steeplechase, pole vault, triple jump and hammer throw competitions being for men only. China comfortably topped the medal table, winning over half the events with 21 golds among a total of 42. The host nation, India, was clear runner-up with eight golds and 22 medals, while Japan (14 medals) was the only other nation to breach double figures. A total of 19 nations reached the medal table.

India's P. T. Usha was the stand-out athlete of the tournament with four gold medals and one silver. She won the 200 metres, 400 metres, 400 metres hurdles and 4 × 400 metres relay, as well as being the 100 metres runner-up. Another Indian runner, Shiny Abraham, won the 800 metres and was second in the 400 m. China's Zhong Huandi claimed a distance double in the women's 3000 metres and 10,000 metres.

Medal summary

Men

Women

Medal table

See also
1989 in athletics (track and field)

References
Asian Championships. GBR Athletics. Retrieved 2019-08-21.

1989
Asian Championships
Asian Championships
Asian Athletics Championships, 1989
Athletics in New Delhi
International athletics competitions hosted by India
Asian Athletics Championships, 1989
Asian Athletics Championships